The Cours du Médoc tram stop came into service on 23 July 2007 on line  of the tramway de Bordeaux.

Location
The station is located on the quay Chartrons in Bordeaux, close to Cours du Médoc.

Close by
 Église Saint-Martial
 Hangars H14, H15 et H16
 Musée Goupil

See also
 TBC
 Tramway de Bordeaux

Bordeaux tramway stops
Tram stops in Bordeaux
Railway stations in France opened in 2007